Brandon Goodwin can refer to:
Brandon Goodwin (lacrosse) (born 1991), Canadian lacrosse player
Brandon Goodwin (basketball) (born 1995), American basketball player